A damn the weather (or damn-the-weather) is a Prohibition Era cocktail made with Gin, sweet vermouth,  orange juice, and a sweetener (either Triple Sec or Curaçao). It is served shaken and chilled, often with a slice of orange or other citrus fruit.

History
Like many prohibition-era cocktails, the damn the weather was conceived as a way to hide the scent and flavor of poor quality homemade spirits, in this case bathtub gin. The original recipe was included in Harry Craddock's 1930 The Savoy Cocktail Book. A bar/restaurant in Seattle takes its name from the drink.

Variations
 The Despite the Weather cocktail is made with shochu, pisco, orange juice, lemon, passion fruit, and ginger syrup.
 The drink may be served over ice in a short glass.
 Grand Marnier or Cointreau may be substituted for the sweetener.

References

Cocktails with gin